"Numb" is a song by Canadian musician Holly McNarland, released as the lead single from her debut studio album, Stuff. The song was very successful in Canada, peaking at number nine on the RPM Top Singles chart and number five on the RPM Alternative 30. The song is featured on MuchMusic's Diamond certified compilation album, Big Shiny Tunes 2.

Track listings
US promo CD
 "Numb"

European CD single
 "Numb"
 "Mr. Five Minutes"
 "Stormy"

Charts

Weekly charts

Year-end charts

References

External links
 

1997 singles
1997 songs
Universal Music Group singles